The DS80C390 is a microcontroller, introduced by Dallas Semiconductor (now part of Maxim Integrated Products), whose architecture is derived from that of the Intel 8051 processor series. It contains a code memory address space of twenty-two bits. It also contains two Controller Area Network (CAN) controllers and a 32-bit integer coprocessor. The open-source Small Device C Compiler (SDCC) supports the processor. It was used in the initial version of the Tiny Internet Interface (TINI) processor module where it was superseded by the DS80C400, a processor that also incorporates an Ethernet port.

References
Home page of the SDCC compiler on SourceForge
Summary page on the Maxim website

Microcontrollers